The Chojnice–Runowo Pomorskie railway is a Polish 149-kilometre long railway line, that connects Chojnice with Szczecinek and Runowo Pomorskie. The line lies in the Pomeranian and West Pomeranian Voivodship.

History
Ruhnow-Konitz, originally Central Pomeranian Railway, since 1875 Prussian State Railways, see also Prussian Eastern Railway.

Stations on the line
Listed from east to west:

References

 

Railway lines in Poland